Boris Lekar, (28 October 1932 – 30 October 2010) was a multidisciplinary artist, considered by critics as one of the exceptional artists of the Soviet emigration to Israel.

Biography

Biographical details 

Boris Lekar was born in the year 1932 in Kharkiv, Ukraine. He immigrated to Israel at the age of 58 in 1990 and although he traveled profusely and worked worldwide Jerusalem remained his home. In Israel he became a focal point for immigrant artists – creating, exhibiting and teaching. In addition to his own exhibitions he hosted exhibitions in his home for tens of young artists and influenced the art of many of them.  He died in October 2010.

Awards 

Ish-Shalom Prize for Lifetime Achievement in Art (In the name of Mordechai Ish-Shalom).
Israels Ministry of Immigrant Absorption Prize
Award for Research in Jewish Art (In the name of Mordechai Narkis).

Selected solo exhibitions 

1993   Jerusalem Theater, Jerusalem, Israel.
1994 Ein Harod Museum, Ein Harod, Israel.
1997 The International Convention Center Gallery, Jerusalem, Israel.
1997 Artist's House, Jerusalem, Israel.
1997 Beit Gabriel Museum, Israel.
1998 Tova Osman Gallery, Tel Aviv, Israel.
1998 Efrat Gallery, Tel Aviv, Israel.
1998 Prozdor Gallery, Tel Aviv, Israel.
1998 Uri and Rami Museum, Israel.
2001 Tadzio Gallery, Kiev, Ukraine.
2003 Knesset, Jerusalem, Israel.
2004 Cite Internacionale des Arts gallery, Paris, France.
2005   "Different Light", Artist's House, Jerusalem, Israel.
2007   "Transitions", Agripas 12 Gallery, Jerusalem, Israel.
2008   "In the Light of Other Language", Agripas 12 Gallery, Jerusalem, Israel.
2009   “Israel Landscapes”, Dudu Gerstein's Gallery, Tel Aviv, Israel.
2011   Memorial Exhibition, Agripas 12 Gallery, Jerusalem, Israel.

Selected group exhibitions 

1995   “New art of Israel” and “Art expo”, New York City.
1996   “landscapes – before and now”, The State Museum of Cyprus, Nicosia.
1999   "100 Years of the Israeli watercolors", Israel Museum, Jerusalem, Israel.
2002   "Object", Artist's House, Jerusalem, Israel.
2004   "Biennale of Graphic Arts", Artist's House, Jerusalem, Israel.
2005   "Paris" Gallery, Paris, France.
2005   "Light", Israel Museum, Jerusalem, Israel.
2006 “Vita Nova”, New Gallery, Jerusalem, Israel.
2007 “Summer in Agripas”, Agripas 12 Gallery, Jerusalem, Israel.
2007 “From the Tunnel Road to Uppsala”, Agripas 12 Gallery, Jerusalem, Israel.
2008 “Surface Fractures”, Artists House, Jerusalem, Israel.
2008 “Agripas Gallery In Tel Aviv”, Dudu Gerstein's Gallery, Tel Aviv, Israel.
2008 ” Israeli Symbols and Images”, Agripas 12 Gallery, Jerusalem, Israel.

External links 

Memorial Site
In memory of Boris Lekar in the site art-in-process.
Article in the magazine Eretz Acheret by Tzipora Luria.
Yonatan Amir writes about Boris in the magazine Erev Rav
Details and pictures from various exhibitions in the site for Israeli art ARTISPO
From the Israeli press
Impression from the exhibition “In the light of different language”

References 

2010 deaths
Jewish painters
Israeli painters
Soviet emigrants to Israel
1932 births
Israeli Jews
Israeli people of Ukrainian-Jewish descent
People from Jerusalem
Landscape artists